Organisation of the Islamic Conference Resolution 10/11, titled "The aggression of the Republic of Armenia against the Republic of Azerbaijan", is an Organisation of the Islamic Conference (now Organisation of Islamic Cooperation) Resolution on Nagorno-Karabakh conflict adopted by its member states on March 13–14, 2008 during the OIC summit in Dakar, Senegal.

The document is one of several resolutions by OIC on Nagorno-Karabakh conflict.

The resolution
Pursuant to the Charter of the Organisation of Islamic Cooperation, the resolution stated the concern of the member states over "aggression by the Republic of Armenia against the Republic of Azerbaijan which has resulted in the occupation of about 20 percent of the territories of Azerbaijan", "the actions perpetrated against civilian Azerbaijani population in the occupied Azerbaijani territories as crimes against humanity", "any looting and destruction of the archeological, cultural and religious monuments in the occupied territories of Azerbaijan" (including Islamic monuments), "illegal transfer of settlers of the Armenian nationality to those territories", expressed deep distress over "the plight of more than one million Azerbaijani displaced persons and refugees resulting from the Armenian aggression and over magnitude and severity of these humanitarian problems". It reaffirmed the OIC Resolution 21/10-P (IS) adopted by the Tenth Session of the OIC Summit held in Putrajaya on October 16–17, 2003) calling Armenia to comply with UN Security Council Resolutions 822, 853, 874 and 884 adopted on April 30, July 29, October 14 and November 12, 1993.
OIC member states reaffirmed their commitment to respect of sovereignty, territorial integrity and political independence of the Republic of Azerbaijan calling for further diplomatic and peaceful efforts of Armenia and Azerbaijan to resolve the Nagorno Karabakh conflict, reiterating destructive influence of the policy of Armenia on the OSCE peace process.

Resolution also called on the UN Security Council to recognize the fact of aggression against the Republic of Azerbaijan, to take the appropriate steps under Chapter VII of the Charter of the United Nations to ensure adherence of Armenia with UN SC resolutions and take coordinated actions on the issue at the United Nations. All states were urged not to provide any military supplies and equipment to Armenia with the purpose of depriving it from any opportunity to escalate the conflict and "continue the occupation of the Azerbaijani territories" and not allow any transit of weaponry to Armenia through their territories.
The resolution expressed full support of OIC member states for the three principles of the settlement of the conflict between Armenia and Azerbaijan from statement of the OSCE Chairman-in-Office at the 1996 Lisbon OSCE Summit, "territorial integrity of the Republic of Armenia and the Republic of Azerbaijan, highest degree of self-rule of the Nagorno-Karabakh region within Azerbaijan and guaranteed security for this region and its whole population". OIC resolution concluded that Azerbaijan has the right for appropriate compensation with regard to damages it suffered as a result of the conflict and puts the responsibility for the compensation of these damages on Armenia.

OIC reiterated its full support to the people of Azerbaijan to defend their country and achieve the restoration of complete sovereignty and territorial integrity of Azerbaijan at the UN General Assembly. The organization takes initiatives to voice the position of the organization on Nagorno-Karabakh conflict in UN sessions.

See also
OIC Council of Foreign Ministers Resolution 10/37
United Nations General Assembly Resolution 62/243
NATO Lisbon Summit Declaration
List of United Nations Security Council resolutions on the Nagorno-Karabakh conflict

References

Organisation of Islamic Cooperation
2008 in international relations
2008 works
First Nagorno-Karabakh War
March 2008 events in Africa